Kafr ad-Dik is a Palestinian town located 9.5 kilometers west of Salfit in the Salfit Governorate, in the northern West Bank and eight kilometers east of the Green Line. According to the Palestinian Central Bureau of Statistics (PCBS), the town had a population of 4,453 in 2007.

Approximately 70% of the families in Kafr ad-Dik are dependent on agriculture as the main source of income, while the remaining 30% work in the private and public sectors. The unemployment rate in the town is 60%.

The town's total land area consists of 15,228 dunams of which 578 dunams are built-up. However, 119 of those dunums is located outside Kafr ad-Dik's jurisdiction. There are five Israeli settlements built on 1,448 dunams of Kafr ad-Dik's land and the population of the settlers is 2,062. As a result of the Interim Agreement on the West Bank and the Gaza Strip, the Palestinian National Authority controls the civil affairs of 1,953 dunums of Kafr ad-Dik's land (Area B), while 13,275 dunams are classified as Area C, which is under full Israeli control.

Location
It is bordered by Bruqin  to the east, Bani Zaid  to the south, Rafat and Deir Ballut to the west, and Biddya and Sarta  to the north.

History
It has been suggested that this is the place mentioned in Crusader sources under the name of Caphaer; a village connected  with the Casale Santa Maria.  In 1175, Crusader  sources mentions   a former cistern-keeper of the village.  In 1176, the revenues from Caphaer (=Kafr ad-Dik) and caslia S. Maria (=Aboud) were given for the provision of white bread for the sick in the Hospital in Jerusalem.

The coat of arms the  Mamluk Sultan Qaitbay  (1468-1496 C.E.) have been found  in a mosque in the village.

Ottoman era
It has been suggested that this village is  the Kafr Bani Hamid of the  1596 Ottoman tax records, with 83 Muslim families.

In 1838 it was noted as a village el-Kufr, part of the Jurat Merda district, south of Nablus.

In 1870  Victor Guérin  found here very considerable remains. They included two birkets cut in the rock,  one 15 paces long by 12 broad, the other not quite so large; about 30 cisterns and 20 tombs cut in the rock, some with sepulchral chambers, their walls pierced with loculi, others simple graves, either intended for a single body or having right and left vaulted tombs with arcosolia. These graves were formerly covered with stone slabs. There were also several lintels, decorated with the rectangular cartouche, on either side of which were triangles, and in the middle a cross. There are four mosques, built with stones and columns belonging to a Christian church. There is also a square tower, measuring 7 paces on each side. It is lit by loopholes, and is covered with immense slabs forming a roof, and supported by vaulted arcades. Within it is a cistern. On the lintel is a cross with equal branches inserted in a circle near four semicircles, which lie in a four-leaved rose. This tower formed part of a larger building, now destroyed.

Guérin noticed houses which were constructed from red and white stone masonry, as in Deir Ghassaneh and Beit Rima.

In 1882, the PEF's Survey of Western Palestine described the village as being "of moderate size on the hillside, and an ancient site, having rock-cut tombs to the east."

British Mandate era

In the 1922 census of Palestine conducted by the British Mandate authorities, Kufr al-Dik had a population of 487, all Muslim, increasing in the 1931 census to 665, still all Muslim, in 139 houses.

In the 1945 statistics the population was 870, all Muslims, while the total land area was 15,308 dunams, according to an official land and population survey. Of this, 2,075 were used for plantations and irrigable land, 2,603 for cereals, while 58 dunams were classified as built-up areas.

Jordanian era
In the wake of the 1948 Arab–Israeli War, and after the 1949 Armistice Agreements, Kafr ad-Dik came under Jordanian rule. It was annexed by Jordan in 1950.

In 1961, the population was 1,365.

1967-present

Since the Six-Day War in 1967, Kafr ad-Dik  has been under Israeli occupation.

After the 1995 accords, 14.5% of village land was classified as Area B, the remaining 85.5% as Area C. Israel has confiscated land from Kafr ad-Dik for Israeli settlements numerous times, including:
594 dunams for Pedu'el, 
300 dunams for Alei Zahav, 
144 dunams for Har Alei Zahav, and 
246 dunams for an industrial zone, near Pedu'el.

After an Israeli court approved the expropriation of 3,000 dunams (750 acres) of private Palestinian land in Kafr ad-Dik's Thahir Subih neighborhood,  bulldozers were called in and reportedly uprooted dozens of olive trees and fruit trees while leveling over 10,000 dunams (2,500 acres). The Israel Civil Administration spokesperson said the works related to a state-backed plan to develop the area's agriculture. In Israel's view, the spokesperson added, these are Israeli state lands.

References

Bibliography

External links
 Welcome To Kafr al-Dik
Kufr ad-Dik, IWPS
Survey of Western Palestine, Map 14:    IAA, Wikimedia commons  
Kafr Ad Dik Town (Fact Sheet), Applied Research Institute–Jerusalem (ARIJ)
Kafr ad Dik Town Profile, ARIJ
 Kafr ad Dik aerial photo, ARIJ
 Kfar Ad Dik and Deir Ballut in Salfit Governorate receive New Land confiscation Order 10, January, 2007, POICA
 More of Bruqin's and Kafr Ad dik's land are targeted by the Segregation Wall 05, March, 2007, POICA
 House Demolitions warnings in Kafr ad Dik village 07, May, 2007, POICA
 The Israeli Occupation Forces re-closes Kafr ad Dik main entrance 05, February, 2010, POICA
  Colonial Expansion amplified on Lands of Kafr ad Dik village 03, December, 2010,  POICA
  Expansions in Eli Zahav and Bedouil Colonies in Kafr ad Dik 05, July, 2011,    POICA
    Demolishing 22 Structures in Kafr ad Dik town - Salfit Governorate 06, October, 2011,   POICA
   Demolition Orders in Kafr ad Dik- Salfit Governorate  11, October, 2011, POICA
   Blocking Kafr ad Dik Entrance  28, January, 2012,  POICA
  Demolishing Cisterns and Sheds in Kafr ad Dik  19, April, 2012,   POICA
 Kafr ad-Dik

Towns in Salfit Governorate
Salfit Governorate
Municipalities of West Bank
Municipalities of the State of Palestine